Merthyr Tydfil and Rhymney may refer to:

 Merthyr Tydfil and Rhymney (UK Parliament constituency)
 Merthyr Tydfil and Rhymney (Senedd constituency)